The Arquivo Nacional de Cabo Verde (acronym: ANCV) is the national archive of Cape Verde.  It is located in the capital city of Praia, on Avenida Combatentes da Liberdade da Patria, in the subdivision of Chã de Areia. It is housed in the former customs building, that was built in 1878.

The Arquivo Histórico Nacional was created on December 31, 1988 under the decree number 128/88, with the purpose of preserving, organizing and disseminating the national archival heritage. On December 9, 2012, the government of Cape Verde approved a new structure of the Ministry of Culture, and the Arquivo Histórico Nacional became the "Arquivo Nacional de Cabo Verde". It contains about 6,000 meters of books of records and separate documents produced by the Central Administration, Municipality Councils, Churches, Registries and Notaries and by the Courts.

See also 
 National Library of Cape Verde
 List of national archives
 List of buildings and structures in Santiago, Cape Verde

References

External links 
 Official website

Cape Verde
Cape Verdean culture
History of Cape Verde
Buildings and structures in Praia
Gamboa-Chã das Areias
1988 establishments in Cape Verde